Jean Thissen (born 21 April 1946) is a retired Belgian international footballer. At the club level, he played for Standard Liège and Anderlecht. He also played internationally for the Belgium national football team in the 1970 FIFA World Cup and the 1972 UEFA European Football Championship.

Thissen coached Beira-Mar, Servette FC, R.U. Saint-Gilloise, Gabon, Standard de Liège, MC Alger and Togo.

Honours

Club

Standard de Liège 

 Belgian First Division: 1968–69, 1969–70, 1970–71
 Belgian Cup: 1965–66, 1966–67
Jules Pappaert Cup: 1971

RSC Anderlecht 

 Belgian Cup: 1974–75, 1975–76
 Belgian League Cup: 1973, 1974
 European Cup Winners' Cup: 1975–76 (winners), 1976–77 (runners-up), 1977–78 (winners)
 European Super Cup: 1976, 1978
 Amsterdam Tournament: 1976
Tournoi de Paris: 1977
 Jules Pappaert Cup: 1977
 Belgian Sports Merit Award: 1978

International 

 UEFA European Championship: 1972 (third place)

References

External links

1946 births
Living people
People from Verviers
Footballers from Liège Province
Belgian footballers
Belgium international footballers
1970 FIFA World Cup players
UEFA Euro 1972 players
Standard Liège players
R.S.C. Anderlecht players
Belgian Pro League players
Belgian football managers
Belgian expatriate football managers
S.C. Beira-Mar managers
Servette FC managers
Expatriate football managers in Algeria
R.E. Virton managers
Royale Union Saint-Gilloise managers
MC Alger managers
Standard Liège managers
1994 African Cup of Nations managers
Association football defenders
Belgian expatriate sportspeople in Gabon
Belgian expatriate sportspeople in Portugal